Lefortovo Tunnel is a road tunnel in the Lefortovo District in Moscow, Russia, opened in 2003. It carries seven lanes of the Third Ring Road. The Third Ring Road was originally planned for a surface alignment across the historic district of Lefortovo; however, public outcry from local residents blocked these plans, and the tunnel was built instead.

The tunnel runs under the Yauza River, and water leaks in at some points.

It has been nicknamed "The Tunnel of Death" owing to its high accident rate and a viral video circulating around the Internet compiling footage of vehicle accidents (many caused by skidding on ice in winter) recorded by monitoring cameras.

References

External links 
 
 Tunnel boring equipment from construction
 Street map, showing the Lefortovo tunnel as a double dotted line
 Lefortovo monitoring structure monitoring
 Video of Lefortovo Tunnel crashes Clean version: Лефортово - тоннель смерти

Streets in Moscow
Road tunnels in Russia
Tunnels completed in 2003